Virginia Ironside (born 3 February 1944) is a British journalist, agony aunt and author. Born in London, she is the daughter of Christopher Ironside, painter and coin designer,  and Janey Ironside who was the first professor of fashion design at the Royal College of Art. She was the niece of the painter and designer Robin Ironside.

Education

Ironside attended Miss Ironside's School in Kensington, where her great-aunt was headmistress.

Career

Ironside writes a column, "Dilemmas", for The Independent, an agony column for the Idler, and a monthly column for The Oldie. Her first book, Chelsea Bird, was published when she was 19. During the 1960s she wrote a rock music column for the Daily Mail newspaper. She is an Honorary Associate of the National Secular Society.

Comments about abortion 
Ironside received attention after her appearance on BBC One's religious discussion programme, Sunday Morning Live, in 2010. She stated "If a baby's going to be born severely disabled or totally unwanted, surely an abortion is the act of a loving mother" and added "If I were the mother of a suffering child – I mean a deeply suffering child – I would be the first to want to put a pillow over its face... If it was a child I really loved, who was in agony, I think any good mother would." Though some viewers supported Ironside, many complaints were registered on the programme's website message board.

My Death My Decision

Ironside is a Patron of the right to die organisation, My Death My Decision. My Death My Decision is a right to die campaign organisation that wants to see a more compassionate approach to dying in the UK, including giving people the legal right to a medically assisted death if that is their persistent wish.

Works
Chelsea Bird (1964)
Distant Sunset (1982)
Made for Each Other (1985)
How to Have a Baby and Stay Sane (1989)
The Subfertility Handbook (Overcoming Common Problems) (1995)
You’ll Get Over It: The Rage of Bereavement (1997)
Problems! Problems!: Confessions of an Agony Aunt (1998)
Goodbye, Dear Friend: Coming to Terms with the Death of a Pet (1998)
Janey and Me: Growing Up with My Mother (2003)
The Huge Bag of Worries (2004)
No! I Don’t Want to Join a Bookclub (2007)
The Virginia Monologues – 20 Reasons Why Growing Old is Great (2009)
 No, I Don’t Need Reading Glasses (2013)
 Yes, I Can Manage, Thank You (2015)
 No Thanks, I’m Quite Happy Standing (2016)

References

External links 
 The Virginia Monologues

1944 births
Living people
British advice columnists
British women columnists
British women writers
British women journalists
Writers from London